WAPS (91.3 FM) – branded 91.3 The Summit – is a non-commercial educational radio station licensed to Akron, Ohio.  Owned and operated by the Akron Public Schools, the station airs Adult Album Alternative (AAA).  WAPS has a standard analog transmission and broadcasts to over four HD Radio channels, and is available online.

WAPS primarily serves the Akron metro area, but also simulcasts over a single full-power repeater: WKTL (90.7 FM), licensed to Struthers, and operated by Struthers High School, which broadcasts the WAPS signal to the Youngstown metro area.

Funding 
Non-commercial WAPS relies on listener membership subscriptions/donations for much of its annual funding.  Additional funding is provided by local and regional businesses and organizations, which underwrite station programming, and grant funds from local and regional philanthropic organizations. The station receives a Community Service Grant from the Corporation For Public Broadcasting.  As of 2009, it receives no direct financial support from owner Akron Public Schools.

Signal 
Founded in September 1955, WAPS originally broadcast on 89.1 until moving to 91.3 in August 1994 to increase signal coverage.  The station moved the transmitter site in December 2002 from the original antenna atop the studio building at 70 North Broadway Street to the Channel 23 television tower to increase signal coverage to points west and south of Akron. In October 2008, WAPS installed a digital transmitter and panel antenna system to maximize the 2,000-watt signal and to begin broadcasting in HD Radio.  As part of the HD radio initiative, it launched a second format on their-  
HD2 audio channel, was originally "Summit Flashbacks," offering a commercial-free mix of "new wave" inspired music from the years 1976 through 1994.
But this channel was rebranded as "The 330", with music produced by artists from northeast Ohio.

In June 2010, WAPS launched an- 
HD3 station for children called KIDJAM! Radio. KIDJAM! Radio aims "to embrace technology by combining high-quality entertainment with a solid foundation for strengthening self-esteem, providing simple steps to good nutrition and developing a positive attitude." The station has its own website, which includes a live online audio stream, www.kidjamradio.com.

September 2011 Rock & Recovery launched a multimedia subscription-free service for those in addiction recovery, their families and health care professionals. It hosted its inaugural broadcast on Sept. 15 from Stan Hywet Hall & Gardens.

Recognition 
WAPS was nominated by Radio and Records Magazine's Industry Achievement Awards as "Triple A Radio Station of The Year: Markets 50+ Noncommercial", in 2006 and 2008.  Readers of local publication Akron Life and Leisure Magazine voted WAPS as "Best Radio Station" in 2006, 2007, 2009 and 2010.

WAPS was listed as one of the "40 Best Little Radio Stations in the U.S." by Paste Magazine in 2010. The station was also recognized as the "Volunteer of the Year" by Akron Public Schools in 2010 for their Music Alive instrument donation program.

References

External links

APS
Adult album alternative radio stations in the United States
NPR member stations
Radio stations established in 1955
1955 establishments in Ohio